Patricia Nell Scott Schroeder (July 30, 1940 – March 13, 2023) was an American politician who represented Colorado's 1st congressional district in the United States House of Representatives from 1973 to 1997. A member of the Democratic Party, Schroeder was the first female U.S. Representative elected from Colorado.

Early years 
Patricia Nell Scott was born on July 30, 1940, in Portland, Oregon, the daughter of Bernice (Lemoin), a first-grade teacher, and Lee Combs Scott, a pilot who owned an aviation insurance company. She moved to Des Moines, Iowa, with her family as a child, and earned her pilot's license when she was fifteen. After graduating from Theodore Roosevelt High School in 1958, she left Des Moines and attended the University of Minnesota, where she majored in history. Schroeder was a member of Chi Omega sorority. She graduated with a Bachelor of Arts in 1961 and earned a Juris Doctor from Harvard Law School in 1964. 

On August 18, 1962, she married Jim Schroeder, a Harvard Law School classmate, and moved to Denver, Colorado, where Jim joined a law firm. They had two children, Scott William (born 1966) and Jamie Christine (born 1970). Schroeder worked for the National Labor Relations Board from 1964 to 1966. She worked for Planned Parenthood as a legal counsel, and taught in Denver's public schools.

U.S. Representative

Campaigns
In 1970, Schroeder's husband Jim ran for a seat in the Colorado General Assembly but lost by only 42 votes. In the same election, 20-year Democratic incumbent Byron Rogers of Colorado's 1st congressional district, based in Denver, lost a primary challenge to more liberal Craig Barnes, and Republican Mike McKevitt won the general election. Ahead of the 1972 election, Jim had asked a man who had declined to run for Congress if his wife would run, to which the man had asked him back: "What about yours?" While intended as an unserious comment, it convinced Schroeder to consider a political career, and she decided to run for the seat on a platform of opposition to the Vietnam War.

Considered a long-shot candidate, Schroeder received no support from the Democratic National Committee and women's groups. Nevertheless, with overconfident McKevitt staying in Washington until the last week of the campaign, Schroeder's message of war, environment, and childcare led to her winning by just over 8,000 votes amid Richard Nixon's massive landslide that year. At age 32, Schroeder was the second youngest woman ever elected to Congress. McKevitt, previously the Denver District Attorney, had been the first Republican to represent the district, regarded as the most Democratic in the Rockies, since Dean M. Gillespie in 1947. However, the district reverted to form, and she was elected 11 more times. She only faced one remotely close contest after her initial run, when she was held to 53 percent of the vote–the only time she would drop below 58 percent.

In 1984, Schroeder was mentioned as a possible running mate for former Vice President Walter Mondale, but the nomination went to Rep. Geraldine Ferraro of New York, who had half Schroeder's tenure in the House.

Years later, Schroeder submitted a Freedom of Information Act request for her FBI file and discovered that she and her staff had been under surveillance during her first congressional campaign. She learned that the FBI had recruited her husband's barber as an informant, and paid a man named Timothy Redfern to break into her home and steal "such all-important secret documents as my dues statement from the League of Women Voters and one of my campaign buttons", demonstrating to her "how paranoid J. Edgar Hoover and his agency were".

Tenure
While in Congress, she became the first woman to serve on the House Armed Services Committee. She was also a member of the original Select Committee on Children, Youth, and Families that was established in 1983.  Schroeder was known during her early tenure in Congress for balancing her congressional work with motherhood, even bringing diapers to the floor of Congress, she was known for advocacy on work-family issues, a prime mover behind the Family and Medical Leave Act of 1993 and the 1985 Military Family Act. Schroeder was also involved in reform of Congress itself, working to weaken the long-standing control of committees by their chairs, sparring with Speaker Carl Albert over congressional "hideaways," and questioning why Congress members who lived in their offices should not be taxed for the benefit.

Schroeder styled herself as a "fiscally conservative liberal". In 1981, she voted against Reagan's tax cuts, as she thought the country could not afford it, also against the 1986 tax-reform bill, favoring more progressive rates. In 1986 she had a 95% rating from Americans For Democratic Action and was also ranked by the National Taxpayers Union as more fiscally conservative than Jack Kemp. In 1989, Schroeder voted against George H. W. Bush's administration more than any House member (79 percent), and often did not vote with fellow Democrats on "party unity" votes.

The Washington Post remarked that Schroeder was "known for her barbed wit", and many of her comments and quips were singled out for media attention during her career. She coined the phrase "Teflon President" to describe Ronald Reagan and his popularity even amid scandal; the idea came to her when she was frying eggs in a Teflon pan. Author Rebecca Traister has recalled that Schroeder responded to concerns about balancing political life with motherhood by saying "I have a brain and a uterus, and they both work." In a 1995 exchange, in which after Rep. Duke Cunningham told then-Representative Bernie Sanders to "sit down, you socialist," during a debate in which Sanders and Schroeder both objected to homophobic comments Cunningham made during the debate, Schroeder asked, "Parliamentary inquiry, Mr. Chairman—do we have to call the Gentleman a gentleman if he's not one?"

She chaired the 1988 presidential campaign of Gary Hart in 1987 until his withdrawal, at which point she strongly considered entering the race, before announcing she would not in a tearful press conference on September 29, 1987. Schroeder's emotional demeanor sparked backlash from across the political spectrum, with conservatives dismissing her behavior, and feminist commentators feeling it made women politicians look less serious. In 2007, twenty years later, Schroeder said that she still received hate mail about the press conference, mostly from women, and said that it exposed a double standard for men and women in politics. She remarked, "Guys have been tearing up all along and people think it's marvelous," she said, citing episodes dating back to Ronald Reagan; but for female candidates, it remains off-limits.

In 1989, she wrote a book titled Champion of the Great American Family: A Personal and Political Book that discussed her own personal story and legislative efforts to enact policy on family issues such as parental leave, child care, family economics, and family planning.

Schroeder did not seek re-election in 1996, citing dissatisfaction with the House's Republican majority. She was succeeded by Colorado state house minority whip Diana DeGette, a fellow Democrat. In her farewell press conference, she joked about "spending 24 years in a federal institution", and titled her 1998 memoir, 24 years of House Work...and the Place Is Still a Mess.

Publishing industry career

Schroeder was named president and CEO of the Association of American Publishers in 1997 and served in that post for 11 years. She advocated for stronger copyright laws, supporting the government in Eldred v. Ashcroft, and opposing Google's plan to digitize books and post limited content online. She also criticized libraries for distributing electronic content without compensation to publishers, writers, and others in the publishing industry, telling The Washington Post, "They aren't rich...they have mortgages." She was a member of the National Leadership Advisory Group for Braille Literacy, encouraging publishers to make books more accessible to blind people or those with other reading difficulties. She also sat on the panel of judges for the PEN / Newman's Own Award.

Schroeder narrated a children's story, "The House that Went on Strike", which was released as a smartphone app in 2012. She wrote about her experience narrating the story and offered her perspective about kids book apps in a July 24, 2012, column in The Huffington Post. Additionally, Schroeder and the book were featured in a profile on Wired.

Later life and death
Following her tenure at AAP, Schroeder and her husband relocated to Celebration, Florida, a master-planned community built by the Walt Disney Company. She was an acquaintance of former Disney CEO Michael Eisner, who helped facilitate the move. In 2010, the city was within the state's 8th congressional district, and Schroeder endorsed Democratic Rep. Alan Grayson for re-election to Congress, citing his stance on women's issues. Grayson lost his re-election campaign. She subsequently endorsed him again ahead of the 2012 congressional elections, during which he returned to Congress. 

Schroeder sat on the board of The League of Women Voters of Florida. She was also a supporter of the Campaign for the Establishment of a United Nations Parliamentary Assembly, an organzation which advocates for democratic reformation of the United Nations.

On March 13, 2023, Schroeder died from complications of a stroke at a hospital in Celebration, Florida, at the age of 82.

Cultural references, influence, and awards
In 1979, the Supersisters trading card set was produced and distributed; one of the cards featured Schroeder's name and picture.

Schroeder was inducted into the Colorado Women's Hall of Fame in 1985. She was inducted into the National Women's Hall of Fame in 1995.

In 1988, Schroeder was parodied in a "Saturday Night Live" skit in which she was portrayed by Nora Dunn as the moderator of the 1988 Republican Primary debate. At the start of the skit the character makes a humorous reference to Schroeder's tearful withdrawal as a Democratic candidate for president in 1987. Along with Dunn in the skit were Dana Carvey (portraying George Bush), Dan Aykroyd (Bob Dole), Phil Hartman (Jack Kemp), Al Franken (Pat Robertson) and Kevin Nealon (Pete DuPont). 

During the 1995 budget debates, after Democrats claimed that Social Security payments would leave seniors with no choice but to eat dog food, Rush Limbaugh said in jest that he was going to get his mother a can opener. Schroeder denounced Limbaugh's remark on the floor of the House.

Schroeder contributed the piece "Running for Our Lives: Electoral Politics" to the 2003 anthology Sisterhood Is Forever: The Women's Anthology for a New Millennium, edited by Robin Morgan.

She was honored by the National Research Center for Women & Families in 2006 for her lifetime of achievements with a Foremother Award.

She was elected to the Common Cause National Governing Board in 2010.

Schroeder was portrayed by Jan Radcliff in the 2016 HBO film Confirmation.

See also
 Women in the United States House of Representatives

References

External links
 Biography maintained by the Clerk of the U.S. House of Representatives
 Lowy, Joan A., Pat Schroeder: a woman of the House (University of New Mexico Press, 2003), 
 The Association of American Publishers

 

|-

|-

1940 births
2023 deaths
20th-century American memoirists
20th-century American politicians
20th-century American women politicians
21st-century American women
American Congregationalists
American feminists
American social democrats
American women lawyers
Candidates in the 1988 United States presidential election
Democratic Party members of the United States House of Representatives from Colorado
Female candidates for President of the United States
Female members of the United States House of Representatives
Harvard Law School alumni
Lawyers from Portland, Oregon
Members of Congress who became lobbyists
People from Osceola County, Florida
Politicians from Denver
Theodore Roosevelt High School (Iowa) alumni
University of Minnesota College of Liberal Arts alumni
Women in Colorado politics